The 2009–10 Bobsleigh World Cup was a multi race tournament over a season for bobsleigh. The season started on 12 November 2009 in Park City, Utah, United States and ended on 24 January 2010 in Igls, Austria (southeast of Innsbruck). The World Cup was organised by the FIBT who also run world cups and championships in skeleton. For this season, it was sponsored by Intersport.

Calendar 
Below is the schedule of the 2009/10 season.

Results

Two-man

Four-man

Two-woman

Standings

Two-man

Four-man

Two-woman

References

External links 
 FIBT

Bobsleigh World Cup
World Cup
World Cup